Monroe is the name for several places in the U.S. state of Indiana:
Monroe, Adams County, Indiana
Monroe, Tippecanoe County, Indiana
Monroe Township, Delaware County, Indiana
Monroe County, Indiana